Bobby Keyes (born November 14, 1982) is a professional American, Canadian defensive back who most recently played for the Edmonton Eskimos of the Canadian Football League. He played college football for the UAB Blazers where he was twice most valuable defensive back as well as first-team All Conference.

College career
He played football for Jones County Junior College before attending University of Alabama-Birmingham.

Professional career
Keyes was originally signed as a rookie undrafted free agent by the Washington Redskins of the National Football League in the 2005 NFL season but was released at the end of training camp.

He signed with the Birmingham Steeldogs of the Af2 arena football league in 2006 and led the team with 66 tackles, 17 pass knockdowns, and 8 interceptions. He was named to the All-Af2 First-team. He then went on to the Dallas Desperados of the Arena Football League, where he played from 2007 to 2008. In 2007, he had 39.5 defensive tackles, 9.5 special teams tackles. He led all AFL rookies and set a Dallas Desperados rookie club record with 6 interceptions, and a team record by recording 5 interceptions in 5 consecutive games, despite being nearly half the season on the injured reserve list. His accomplishments got him named to the AFL All-Rookie Team. In 2008, he had 9 defensive tackles before being placed on the injured reserve list on May 21.

On May 29, 2009, Keyes signed as a free agent with the Edmonton Eskimos of the Canadian Football League. On August 29, 2009, he recorded his first CFL interception and returned it 67 yards. It was also notable as the first, long-awaited interception of the 2009 Edmonton Eskimos season, for which he won the first interception pool into which players had paid $20 each week and had finally amounted to over $1000 by week 9.

Personal
When not playing football, Keyes makes his home in Baton Rouge, Louisiana, with his wife Zakia and his two young sons named Braylon and Sean-Cole keyes and now have a baby on the way. The baby was a girl named Kylie.

References

External links
Just Sports Stats

1982 births
Living people
People from Raleigh, Mississippi
American football defensive backs
Canadian football defensive backs
American players of Canadian football
Jones County Bobcats football players
UAB Blazers football players
Washington Redskins players
Alabama Steeldogs players
Dallas Desperados players
Edmonton Elks players